Acoustic Sounds, Inc. is a mail-order business specializing in the sale of audiophile vinyl LPs, Direct Stream Digital/PCM downloads (SuperHiRez.com), SACDs, Reel-To-Reel album reissues (Analogue Productions Ultra Tape), DVD-Audios, high-quality CDs and high-end stereo equipment. Located in Salina, Kansas, United States. The business is owned and operated by Chad Kassem and as of 2016 employed 98 people.

Company history
Kassem started Acoustic Sounds in 1986, initially running it solo out of a two-bedroom apartment. Precisely when CDs were being introduced to the public and people were dumping their LP records in favor of CDs, Kassem was purchasing collectible high-quality LPs and then reselling them via buy-sell-and-trade advertisements in various record collector and audiophile magazines. Kassem's record collection grew until he literally lived in a field of Vinyl records. LPs stacked in the living room, the bedrooms, the closets, the kitchen and finally even the bathroom. A small apartment shrunk to only a few pathways — one from the listening position to the kitchen; another from the listening room to the bathroom; and one to each of the bedrooms. Orders grew and Acoustic Sounds was born.

That was 1988, and Kassem’s budding success allowed him to purchase a four-bedroom, ranch-styled house. Initially, it even looked like a home. But soon came more records. They devoured the basement, where Kassem’s now full-time business had added a few employees. They started climbing the stairs and soon controlled the living room and bedroom. This time the bathrooms were spared, but little else in Kassem’s workplace and home escaped the vinyl. He hired more employees for a shrinking workspace. Finally, when 18-wheelers started pulling up to Kassem’s residential address to deliver pallets, it was time to move.

New business divisions added
In 1991, Kassem scouted out a 3,500-square-foot former dance studio in this mid-sized Kansas downtown. At first the space was a dream. There was room for shelves to stock inventory. There was a conventional shipping-and-receiving area. But Acoustic Sounds continued to grow.   In 1992, Kassem launched a reissue label called Analogue Productions. Kassem contracted with record labels – majors and independents – and licensed the original analog master tapes of choice recordings. He then had those titles remastered and pressed on a superior grade of vinyl and then offered the finished product for sale through his Acoustic Sounds catalog and to wholesale accounts around the world. Analogue Productions now has more than 450 titles in print.
Also during this time, in 1993, Kassem began APO Records (Analogue Productions Originals), an original record label focused on recording the most authentic and legendary blues artists still living. APO’s first title – Jimmy Rogers/Blue Bird – won the 1995 W.C. Handy Traditional Blues Album of the Year. APO Records as of 2011 had 43 titles available.

Recording studio in Gothic-style church
By 1994, Acoustic Sounds had again outgrown its space. Kassem found a warehouse with enough room for his growing inventory and plenty of office space. There was a loading dock for the shipping. There was a large basement for overstock. The building was perfect for about eight years. But finally, records began to stack on and around employees’ desks, across the floor of what was supposed to be the shipping and receiving area and in every single corner of the building. Plus, Acoustic Sounds started to sell more equipment, which meant turntables, CD players, accessories and the like had to compete with the LPs and CDs for the limited space. So, after 10 years in the warehouse, it was time to move.  In the meantime, Acoustic Sounds further branched into new musical endeavors with the addition of Blue Heaven Studios. In 1996, Kassem purchased an old Gothic-style church in downtown Salina. He initially planned to use the space for storage for Acoustic Sounds’ overflow inventory. But after recognizing how incredible the church’s natural Acoustics were, Kassem decided to outfit it as a state-of-the-art recording studio. After a significant financial investment, including completely new electrical service, the building of a control room and the outfitting of the church with modern recording equipment and microphones, Blue Heaven was born. Kassem also left the original pew and balcony seats in the church sanctuary and so the space doubles as a concert hall. In August 1997, Jimmy Rogers performed the first concert at Blue Heaven. Beginning in 1998, Blue Heaven began hosting an annual two-night concert series called the Blues Masters at the Crossroads. Fans flock from around the world each October to see the most legendary lineup of Blues artists assembled. Blue Heaven also became the home of APO Records and is where all of the APO titles have been recorded since 1998. The studio is also available for anyone to book session time and additionally is available for weddings.

Record pressing plant launched
Kassem was photographed for the cover of Billboard magazine, a leading publication in the music industry, in a profile written by Chris Morris for the Aug. 17, 2002, issue titled "Audiophile Labels Put a New Spin On Vinyl."
In 2004, Acoustic Sounds moved from their 6,000-square-foot warehouse to an 18,000-square-foot former grocery store. At the time, the space seemed big enough to allow for as much growth as could possibly be foreseen. But just six years later, in 2010, Acoustic Sounds had once again outgrown its space. Kassem then purchased three buildings. All of the inventory was moved to a 28,000-square-foot warehouse. The office workers were moved to a 20,000-square-foot office building.
The third building – 21,000 square feet – was used to launch the latest Acoustic Sounds venture, Quality Record Pressings (QRP), a modern record pressing plant. QRP operates three different kinds of record presses and has equipped each with pioneering modifications, including adding microprocessors to the presses so that they will cycle based on temperature rather than the less accurate cycling by time.
All of the Analogue Productions reissues and the APO Records titles are now pressed at QRP and the pressing plant also handles the jobs of several other record labels.

SuperHiRez DSD/PCM download site launched
On August 28, 2013, Acoustic Sounds launched SuperHiRez.com, an Internet site selling mainstream title high-resolution album downloads from major record labels, produced using Direct Stream Digital (DSD) as well as PCM audio formats. 
On December 30, 2021, the decision was made to shutdown Acoustic Sounds Super HiRez digital downloads
service after seven years due to streaming continuing to eclipse downloading.
https://store.acousticsounds.com/superhirezd
Uncompressed DSD technology results in music as close to the master recording as possible and is the same technology employed in the manufacture of SACDs. Kassem said publicly he expected the service to offer as many as 500 titles by year-end. On September 4, 2013, Acoustic Sounds announced an agreement with Sony Music Entertainment to provide the company's new digital download service with albums that have been produced or remastered in Direct Stream Digital format. The deal followed an earlier agreement reached with Universal Music Group.

See also 
 Analogue Productions
 Blue Heaven Studios
 Quality Record Pressings

References

External links
 Acoustic Sounds
 Salina record-maker revels in vinyl’s comeback - The Wichita Eagle

Mail-order retailers
Music retailers of the United States
Companies based in Kansas
1986 establishments in Kansas